Axiokastro is a village in the municipal unit of Neapoli, Kozani regional unit, Greece. Its population in 2011 was 133.

References

Populated places in Kozani (regional unit)